Adelaide Bowling Club was founded in 1897 and is the oldest bowling club in South Australia.

The club was founded as the result of a public meeting called by Henry F. Dench and chaired by J. H. Finlayson.
The Governor, Sir T. Fowell Buxton accepted the position of patron.
Lavington Bonython, James Marshall, R. Kyffin Thomas, W. H. R. Porter, F. W. Thomas, F. Coombs, B. H. Pascoe, W. Thyer, F. W. Good, W. D. Reed, V. Lawrence, H. A. Grainger, F. A. Crump, J. H. Finlayson, and E. Eglinton were among the charter members. Sir Edwin T. Smith, Robert Barr Smith, William Gilbert, and A. H. Grainger were also among the founding members and supporters.

The first green was established on a plot  behind Government House, North Terrace. Its location was later an impediment to a plan by the Adelaide City Council to extend Kintore Avenue through to Victoria Drive, and so provide another exit from the city and so reduce traffic congestion. For this reason, the club was moved to its present location in 1958.

The Club now has its premises within Rymill Park in the eastern parklands, with the entrance off Dequetteville Terrace.

References

External links
 

1897 establishments in Australia
Sports clubs established in 1897
Bowls in Australia
Sporting clubs in Adelaide
Bowls clubs